Pailhe is a district of the municipality of Clavier, located in the province of Liège in Wallonia, Belgium.

The settlement consists of the village Pailhe and the hamlet Saint-Fontaine. The name Pailhe is mentioned in written sources for the first time in 1179. It was pillaged by troops from the Duchy of Lorraine at the end of the 17th century. The village church dates from 1847 but contains older furnishings. In Saint-Fontaine there is a Romanesque chapel, dating from the 12th century, and a château built in 1820.

References

External links

Populated places in Liège Province